Slime Rancher 2 is a first-person life simulation adventure video game developed and published by American indie studio Monomi Park. Slime Rancher 2 is the direct sequel to its predecessor Slime Rancher (2017). It features the playable character and main protagonist of Slime Rancher, Beatrix LeBeau, exploring a new location called Rainbow Island. The game released in early access on September 22, 2022, for Xbox Series X/S and Microsoft Windows via the Microsoft Store, Steam, and Epic Games Store.

Gameplay
In an open world the player controls the character Beatrix LeBeau, a rancher who moved from planet Earth to a far away planet to live the life of a slime rancher, centered around ranch construction and the exploration of the environment in order to collect, raise, feed, and breed slimes, gelatinous living organisms of various sizes and characteristics.

The game revolves around feeding slimes the correct food so that they can produce "plorts", which can be sold in exchange for Newbucks, a currency required to purchase upgrades for the ranch and its equipment. There are different kinds of slimes in the world, including some introduced for Slime Rancher 2. Slimes react and change based on what they are fed.

Development and release
Slime Rancher 2 was revealed on June 13, 2021, having been featured during the 2021 Xbox & Bethesda Games Showcase. During the Xbox & Bethesda Games Showcase 2022 more information about the game was revealed along with a projected release date of fall 2022. Slime Rancher 2 was released in early access on September 22, 2022, for Microsoft Windows and Xbox Series X/S.

Slime Rancher 2 uses the Unity engine. It utilizes Unity's new High Definition Render Pipeline, a render pipeline that handles graphical features. This required a new approach to the graphics pipeline compared to the one used in the previous game.

References

External links

Upcoming video games
Biological simulation video games
Early access video games
Farming video games
First-person adventure games
Golden Joystick Award winners
Indie video games
Open-world video games
Science fiction video games
Single-player video games
Video game sequels
Video games developed in the United States
Video games featuring female protagonists
Video games set on fictional planets
Windows games
Xbox Series X and Series S games
Xbox Cloud Gaming games